Loïc Courteau and Horst Skoff were the defending champions, but did not participate this year.

Tomás Carbonell and Sergio Casal won the title after finalists Jay Berger and Horacio de la Peña withdrew prior to the championship match.

Seeds

  Hans Gildemeister /  Cássio Motta (semifinals)
  Javier Frana /  Christian Miniussi (first round)
  Ricardo Acuña /  Carlos di Laura (first round)
  Tomás Carbonell /  Sergio Casal (champions)

Draw

Draw

References
Draw

1987 Buenos Aires Grand Prix
ATP